James Edward Rice (born March 8, 1953), nicknamed "Jim Ed", is a former Major League Baseball left fielder and designated hitter. He was inducted into the Baseball Hall of Fame on July 26, 2009, as the 103rd member voted in by the BBWAA. Rice played his entire 16-year baseball career for the Boston Red Sox.

Rice was an eight-time American League (AL) All-Star and was named the AL's Most Valuable Player in  after becoming the first major league player in 19 years to hit for 400 total bases. He went on to become the ninth player to lead the major leagues in total bases in consecutive seasons. He joined Ty Cobb as one of two players to lead the AL in total bases three years in a row. He batted better than .300 in seven seasons, collected 100 runs batted in (RBI) eight times.had 200 hits four times, along with having 11 seasons hitting at least 20 home runs. He also led the league in home runs three times, RBIs and slugging percentage twice each, and enjoyed averaging more than 117 hits for every 100 regular season MLB games he had played in during his career.

From 1975 through 1980 he was part of one of the sport's great outfields along with Fred Lynn and Dwight Evans (who was his teammate for his entire career); Rice continued the tradition of his predecessors Ted Williams and Carl Yastrzemski as a power-hitting left fielder who played his entire career for the Red Sox. He ended his career with a .502 slugging percentage, and then ranked tenth in AL history with 382 home runs; his career marks in homers, hits (2,452), RBI (1,451) and total bases (4,129) remain Red Sox records for a right-handed hitter, with Evans eventually surpassing his Boston records for career runs scored, at bats and extra base hits by a right-handed hitter. When Rice retired, his 1,503 career games in left field ranked seventh in AL history.

Notable seasons
In the minor leagues, Rice's three-run home run was the key blow in helping the Pawtucket Red Sox (International League) defeat the Tulsa Oilers (American Association) in a 5–2 win in the 1973 Junior World Series. After he was AAA's International League Rookie of the Year, Most Valuable Player and Triple Crown winner in 1974, he and fellow rookie teammate Fred Lynn were brought up to the Red Sox at the same time, and were known as the "Gold Dust Twins". He was promoted in the Red Sox organization to be a full-time player in 1975, and finished in second place for the American League's Rookie of the Year honors, and third in the Most Valuable Player voting, after he finished the season with 174 base hits, 102 runs batted in, a .309 batting average and 22 home runs; Lynn won both awards. The Red Sox won the AL's East Division, but Rice did not play in either the League Championship Series or World Series because of a wrist injury sustained during the last week of the regular season when he was hit by a pitch. The Red Sox went on to lose the World Series 4 games to 3 to the Cincinnati Reds of the National League (NL).

In 1978, Rice won the Most Valuable Player award in a campaign where he hit .315 (third in the league) and led the league in home runs (46), RBI (139), hits (213), triples (15), total bases (406, a Red Sox record) and slugging percentage (.600). He is one of only two AL players ever to lead his league in both triples and home runs in the same season, and he remains the only player ever to lead the major leagues in triples, home runs and RBIs in the same season. His 406 total bases that year were the most in the AL since Joe DiMaggio had 418 in 1937, and it made Rice the first major leaguer with 400 or more total bases since Hank Aaron's 400 in 1959. This feat was not repeated until 1997, when Larry Walker had 409 in the NL. No AL player has done it since Rice in 1978, and his total remains the third highest by an AL right-handed hitter, behind DiMaggio and Jimmie Foxx (438 in ).
 
At the end of the 1983 season Rice led the AL in 4 different categories which included home runs, RBI's, total bases, and grounding into double plays (GDPs). In that year he had tied the Milwaukee Brewers George Scott's (1975) record and became the second player to              ever lead the AL in HRs, RBI's and GDPs in the same season. In 2012 Miguel Cabrera, as a member of the Detroit Tigers became the third AL player to reach this mark. At the present time no NL player had led the that league in these 3 categories at the same time.

In 1986, Rice had 200 hits, batted .324, and had 110 RBIs. The Red Sox made it to the World Series for the second time during his career. This time, Rice played in all 14 postseason games, where he collected 14 hits, including two home runs. He also scored 14 runs and drove in six. The 14 runs Rice scored is the fifth most recorded by an individual during a single year's postseason play. The Red Sox went on to lose the World Series to the New York Mets, 4 games to 3, the fourth consecutive Series appearance by Boston which they lost in seven games.

Career accomplishments

Rice led the AL in home runs three times (1977, 1978, 1983), in RBI twice (1978, 1983), in slugging percentage twice (1977, 1978), and in total bases four times (1977–1979, 1983). He also picked up Silver Slugger Awards in 1983 and 1984 (the award was created in 1980). Rice hit at least 39 home runs in a season four times, had eight 100-RBI seasons and four seasons with 200+ hits, and batted over .300 seven times. He finished his 16-year career with a .298 batting average, 373 doubles, 79 triples, 382 home runs, 1,451 RBIs, 1,249 runs scored, 2,452 hits, 670 walks and 4,129 total bases. He was an American League All-Star eight times (1977–1980, 1983–1986). In addition to winning the American League MVP award in 1978, he finished in the top five in MVP voting five other times (1975, 1977, 1979, 1983, 1986).

Rice is the only player in history to lead the league in home runs, RBIs, and triples in the same year. He is also the only player in major league history to record over 200 hits while hitting 39 or more home runs for three consecutive years. He is tied for the AL record of leading the league in total bases for three straight seasons, and was one of three AL players to have three straight seasons of hitting at least 39 home runs while batting .315 or higher. From 1975 to 1986, Rice led the AL in total games played, at bats, runs scored, hits, homers, RBIs, slugging percentage, total bases, extra base hits, go-ahead RBIs, multi-hit games, and outfield assists. Among all major league players during that time, Rice was the leader in five of these categories (Mike Schmidt is next, having led in four).

In 1984 Rice set a major league single-season record by hitting into 36 double plays. On the backside of a 1964  Topps baseball card of Earl Wilson #503, Goose Goslin who got his start in 1921, was credited with Grounding into 48 Double plays in a season during his career. Rice's 315 career double plays grounded into ranks him tied in eighth place on the career leaders list with Eddie Murray. However, this mark was not followed closely until the mid to late 1930's. Rice did break Brooks Robinson's AL record for a right-handed hitter (297) in 1988. Cal Ripken Jr. eventually surpassed this mark in 1999. Rice had led the league for four seasons (1982–1985), which tied the major league record that had been established by Ernie Lombardi. In 2009 Miguel Tejada recorded his fifth season leading his league in this category and now holds this record. During the time Rice was the annual GDP leader he also had averaged 112 RBI's per season which is ten RBI's better than second place Albert Pujols' RBI average of 102 following his four-year GDP leadership. The on-base prowess of Rice's teammates placed him in a double play situation over 2,000 times during his career.  Rice posted a batting average of .310 and slugging percentage of .515 in those situations which is better than his overall career marks in those categories.

During his career Rice played in 35 games where he hit 2 or more HRs, and had driven in 4 or more runs 48 times. He could hit for both power and average, and currently only 12 other retired players rank ahead of him in both career home runs and batting average: Hank Aaron, Jimmie Foxx, Lou Gehrig, Willie Mays, Stan Musial, Mel Ott, Babe Ruth, Ted Williams, Chipper Jones, Vladimir Guerrero, Mike Piazza, and Larry Walker. In 1981, Lawrence Ritter and Donald Honig included him in their book The 100 Greatest Baseball Players of All Time.

Rice was an accomplished left fielder, finishing his career with a fielding percentage of .980 and had 137 outfield assists (comparable to Ted Williams' figures of .974 and 140). Although never possessing great speed, he had a strong throwing arm and was able to master the various caroms that balls took from the Green Monster (in left field) in Fenway Park. His 21 assists in 1983 remains the most by a Red Sox outfielder since 1944, when Bob Johnson had 23. Aside from playing 1543 games as an outfielder during his career, Rice also appeared as a designated hitter in 530 games.

Rice's number 14 was retired by the Red Sox in a pre-game ceremony on July 28, 2009.

Community activities
Rice was associated with a variety of charitable organizations during his career, primarily on behalf of children, some of which have carried on into his retirement. He was named an honorary chairman of The Jimmy Fund, the fundraising arm of the Dana–Farber Cancer Institute in Boston, in 1979, and in 1992 was awarded that organization's "Jimmy Award", which honors individuals who have demonstrated their dedication to cancer research. Rice is also active in his support of the Neurofibromatosis Foundation of New England. Rice's involvement with Major League Baseball's RBI program (Reviving Baseball in Inner Cities) resulted in the naming of a new youth baseball facility in Roxbury, Massachusetts, in his honor in 1999. A youth recreation center in Rice's hometown of Anderson, South Carolina, is also named in his honor.

Rice is also remembered for his actions during a nationally televised game (against the Chicago White Sox) on August 7, 1982, when he rushed into the stands to help a young boy who had been struck in the head by a line drive off the bat of Dave Stapleton. As other players and spectators watched, Rice left the dugout and entered the stands to help four-year-old Jonathan Keane, who was bleeding heavily. Rice carried the boy onto the field, through the Red Sox dugout and into the clubhouse, where the young boy was immediately treated by the team's medical staff. Rice's swift response saved Keane's life, as paramedics would likely not have arrived in time. Rice also paid the hospital bill, and Keane made a full recovery from the injury.

Retirement activities
In 1990, Rice agreed to play with the St. Petersburg Pelicans of the short-lived Senior Professional Baseball Association. Afterwards, Rice has served as a roving batting coach (1992–1994) and hitting instructor (1995–2000), and remains an instructional batting coach (2001–present) with the Red Sox organization. While the Red Sox hitting coach, the team led the league in hitting in 1997 and players won two batting titles. Rice was the hitting coach for the American League in the 1997 and 1999 Major League Baseball All-Star Games, both under the same manager, the New York Yankees' Joe Torre.  Since 2003, he's also been employed as a commentator for the New England Sports Network (NESN), where he contributes to the Red Sox pre-game and post-game shows. He had a cameo appearance in the NESN movie Wait Till This Year and in the film Fever Pitch. The former slugger has been known to pass his wisdom on to the current Sox players and stars from time to time. Rice was elected to the Boston Red Sox Hall of Fame when it first opened in 1995, and he is the 40th member of Ted Williams' Museum and Hitters Hall of Fame, having been inducted along with Paul Molitor, Dave Winfield and Robin Yount in 2001. On November 29, 2008, the Boston chapter of the Baseball Writers' Association of America (BBWAA) announced that Rice would be the recipient of the Emil Fuchs Award for long and meritorious service to baseball.

During his Hall of Fame acceptance speech Rice revealed that he is a devoted fan of The Young and the Restless, noting that he was watching the show when he was informed of his acceptance.

Hall of Fame

While Rice was generally regarded as one of the better hitters of his era based upon the statistics traditionally used by the BBWAA to evaluate players' Hall of Fame qualifications, he was not elected until his 15th and final year of eligibility, netting 76.4% of the votes, in 2009. Over the years he was on the BBWAA ballot, he received 3,974 total votes, the most ever collected by any player that was voted on for baseball's highest honor. In 2006 and 2007, he received over 63% of votes cast. Rice just missed being elected in 2008 when the count found him on 72.2% of the ballots, only 2.8% short of the required 75%. Rice became the third enshrinee to get into the shrine on his last chance on the ballot, and the first since Ralph Kiner (1975).

Rice's delay in being elected to the Hall of Fame stemmed in part from more current statistical analysis of player performance. This analysis suggested that Rice's HOF credentials might have been more questionable than they were considered during his career. The delay may also have been related to his often difficult relationship with the media during his playing career, many of whom are still voting members of the BBWAA, and his career fading relatively early – he last played in the major leagues at the age of 36. Some writers, such as the Boston Herald's Sean McAdam, said that Rice's chances improved with the exposure of the "Steroids Era" in baseball. In the same article, McAdam expanded this subject by adding: "In an era when power numbers are properly viewed with a healthy dose of suspicion, Rice's production over the course of his 16 years gains additional stature." As such, he has received increasingly more votes each year since the 2003 ballot, improving his vote totals by 133 votes over the last five years on the ballot. However, from several sabermetric standpoints it can be argued that Rice falls short of his peers in the Hall of Fame. Nevertheless, several commentators have noted that the continued criticism of Rice's statistics not meeting sabermetric standards is unfair given that several other Hall of Fame players, notably Andre Dawson and Tony Pérez, fare even worse against such standards.

During the 2007 season, the Pawtucket Red Sox started a campaign to get Rice inducted which included having fans sign "the World's Largest Jim Rice Jersey."

Although other players have compiled career statistics more similar to Rice's, most notably 1999 Hall inductee Orlando Cepeda, perhaps the most similar player to Rice was 1968 inductee Joe Medwick. Both were power-hitting left fielders who batted right-handed and played their home games in stadiums which favored hitters, and both had a period of a few years in which they enjoyed a remarkable burst of offense, each winning an MVP award at age 25 – Rice after collecting 400 total bases, and Medwick after becoming the last NL player to win the Triple Crown. Both retired at age 36 due to the cumulative effect of various minor injuries. Their career totals in games, at bats, runs, hits, RBI, steals, on-base percentage, slugging percentage, extra base hits and total bases are all fairly similar, with notable differences only in batting average and home runs; Medwick's higher average (.324 to .298) can be partially attributed to the higher emphasis on batting average in the 1930s, while Rice's advantage in home runs (382 to 205) is largely the result of a dramatic increase in homers over the 40 years between their careers (Rice ranked 10th in AL history upon his retirement, while Medwick ranked 11th in NL history upon his). Medwick was elected to the Hall in his final season of eligibility in 1968, which Rice also duplicated.

See also

List of Major League Baseball career home run leaders
Boston Red Sox Hall of Fame
List of Major League Baseball career hits leaders
List of Major League Baseball career runs scored leaders
List of Major League Baseball career runs batted in leaders
List of Major League Baseball career total bases leaders
List of Major League Baseball annual runs batted in leaders
List of Major League Baseball annual home run leaders
List of Major League Baseball annual triples leaders
List of Major League Baseball players who spent their entire career with one franchise
Major League Baseball titles leaders

References

   Official Website of the Boston Red Sox
 
 
 Ted Williams Museum Hitters Hall of Fame
 Cooperstown Calls For Henderson, Rice

External links

, or Retrosheet
SABR BioProject biography
Jim Rice - Baseballbiography.com 
Jim Rice for Hall of Fame
Baseball Almanac
Jim Rice mentioned on Red Sox Radio WEEI
Jim Rice Batting Fundamentals
 Rice dominated AL for a decade – Boston slugger again up for Hall of Fame inclusion
THE CULLING by D. Allan Kerr -- "One More Time At Bat For Jim Rice" 
Pura Pelota  1973–74 Venezuelan Professional Baseball League season

1953 births
Living people
African-American baseball coaches
African-American baseball players
American League All-Stars
American League home run champions
American League Most Valuable Player Award winners
American League RBI champions
American sportsmen
Baseball players from South Carolina
Boston Red Sox announcers
Boston Red Sox coaches
Boston Red Sox players
Bristol Red Sox players
Major League Baseball broadcasters
Major League Baseball hitting coaches
Major League Baseball left fielders
Major League Baseball players with retired numbers
National Baseball Hall of Fame inductees
Navegantes del Magallanes players
American expatriate baseball players in Venezuela
Pawtucket Red Sox players
People from Anderson, South Carolina
Silver Slugger Award winners
St. Petersburg Pelicans players
Williamsport Red Sox players
Winter Haven Red Sox players
International League MVP award winners
21st-century African-American people
20th-century African-American sportspeople